BNT 2 is a Bulgarian-language public television station, operated by the Bulgarian National Television. It is the successor to the defunct second program of the national television - Efir 2. 

Launched on October 16, 2011, the channel replaced the five regional television centers of BNT - BNT Pirin, BNT More, BNT Sever, BNT Plovdiv and BNT Sofia by combining their programs into one. Until 2018, BNT 2 broadcasts original programs, newscasts and sporting events. The program includes a "regional programming bloc" with local opt-out broadcasts from BNT's regional television centers.

Since 2018, BNT 2 has ended its newscasts and is only currently mostly broadcasting cultural programs and programs produced by BNT's regional television centers (which includes local-based newscasts instead of sending local news production to be broadcast nationally).

History
The second program of the Bulgarian national television was founded in 1975 and discontinued transmission on May 31, 2000, being replaced by the private bTV the following day. Efir 2's most popular program was its weekly magazine show "Vsyaka Nedelya" and for broadcasting the Italian Serie A football games (which in fact were part of the same Sunday show).

At 21:10 on May 31, 2000, Efir 2 "said Good-bye!" to the Bulgarian viewers with a documental film, produced by Ekaterina Genova, called "Efir 2 - a photo for a memory". After the movie, Efir 2 broadcast its last news and sports reports, as well as its final commercial break, another movie, and Ricky Martin's "One night only". 40 minutes after midnight, Efir 2's signal was switched off, replaced by bTV the following morning.

Programing

Kids

Current Programing
16 Hudson
The Adventures of Chuck and Friends
Annedroids
Bitz & Bob
Bobs & LoLo
Club 57 (TV series)
Danger Mouse
The Deep
Dinotrux
Be Be Bears
Paper Tales
Doki Adventures
Dot.
Emma!
Henry Danger
Julius Jr.
Justin Time (TV series)
Miss Moon
Pat & Mat
Pat & Stalney
Peg + Cat
Sunny Bunnies
Zig & Sharko
Zou

Logos

Eastern Bloc mass media
Television networks in Bulgaria
Bulgarian-language television stations
Television channels and stations established in 1974